Gabriela Slavec is a Slovenian female ballooning athlete, who became European Champion in 2010.

In 2010 Slavec won gold at 1st FAI Women's European Championships in Alytus, Lithuania. Two years later she started with the number "1" at the second event in Frankenthal where she finished 8th.

Slavec is married, a mother and lives in Brazil.

Competition record

European Championships 
 1st FAI Women's European Hot Air Balloon Championship in Alytus, Lithuania, 2010 – European Champion
 2nd FAI Women's European Hot Air Balloon Championship in Frankenthal, Germany, 2012 – 8th

References 

Living people
Slovenian balloonists
Slovenian sportswomen
Year of birth missing (living people)